A Łódź Pabianicka  is a commuter station located in the city of Łódź, Poland, in Górna district, on a circular line between Łódź Kaliska and Łódź Chojny stations, in direct vicinity of the crossroads of Pabianicka St with John Paul II Avenue and Górna Road.

The station was opened in 2013, as part of Łódź Commuter Railway project. It consists of two single-edged platforms located north to the railway viaduct over Pabianicka street. Each platform is equipped with a small shelter with benches, a board with current schedule, a staircase and an elevator. A passage between platforms is provided through an under-track passage for a pavement running along the street.

The station serves ŁKA commuter trains running between Łódź Kaliska and Łódź Widzew stations, along with Polregio regional trains from Łódź Kaliska to Częstochowa and Opoczno. Up to 2017 it was also a stopping point for PKP Intercity trains between Warsaw and Wrocław.

Train services
The station is served by the following services:

 InterRegio services (IR) Łódź Kaliska — Warszawa Glowna 
 InterRegio services (IR) Ostrów Wielkopolski — Łódź — Warszawa Główna
 InterRegio services (IR) Poznań Główny — Ostrów Wielkopolski — Łódź — Warszawa Główna
 Regional services (PR) Łódź Kaliska — Częstochowa 
 Regional services (PR) Łódź Kaliska — Skarżysko-Kamienna

References 

Railway stations in Poland opened in 2013
Pabianicka
Railway stations served by Przewozy Regionalne InterRegio
Railway stations served by Łódzka Kolej Aglomeracyjna